Henry Hayes was a member of the Wisconsin State Assembly during the 1863 session. Hayes represented the 3rd District of Sheboygan County, Wisconsin. He was a Democrat.

References

People from Sheboygan County, Wisconsin
Year of birth missing
Year of death missing
Democratic Party members of the Wisconsin State Assembly